Siegershausen railway station is a railway station in the village of Siegershausen, within the municipality of Kemmental, in the Swiss canton of Thurgau. It is an intermediate stop on the standard gauge Wil–Kreuzlingen line of THURBO.

Services 
The following services stop at Siegershausen:

 St. Gallen S-Bahn : half-hourly service between Weinfelden and Konstanz.

References

External links 
 
 

Railway stations in the canton of Thurgau
THURBO stations